Calamagrostis tweedyi, the Cascade reedgrass or Tweedy's reedgrass, is a perennial in the grass family. It is native to the Pacific Northwest in the United States, in Washington, Oregon, Idaho, and Montana.

Taxonomy
Cascade reedgrass was first described and published as Deyeuxia tweedyi in 1883 by Frank Lamson-Scribner, who named it in honor of Frank Tweedy, the first to collect it. A fragment of Tweedy's specimen, an alleged isotype, is deposited at the US National Herbarium; the location of the holotype is unknown.

In 1892, Scribner moved Cascade reedgrass to the genus Calamagrostis. Peterson et al. (2019) recently proposed moving it to the genus Greeneochloa in their revision of Calamagrostis based on morphological and molecular evidence. G. tweedyi would be one of two species in that genus.

Description
Its leaves have open sheaths and membranous ligules 6–15 mm long; auricles are absent. Its spikelets consist of two glumes roughly equal in size, which enclose and are slightly longer than the single floret. The sharply bent awn from the lemma exceeds the glumes by as much as 5 mm, a notable characteristic for this species. The callus of the floret is only slightly bearded, the hairs short.

Calamagrostis tweedyi can be distinguished from other reedgrasses in the region by its flat broad leaves combined with long bent awns and only slightly hairy calluses. Vegetative plants are similar to Cinna latifolia, being stout with broad leaves, and the two sometimes grow in the same habitat.

Distribution
Calamagrostis tweedyi is endemic to the Pacific Northwest in the United States, growing in central Washington, Oregon (reported from near Crater Lake), central Idaho, and western Montana. It grows in montane and subalpine moist meadows and coniferous forests at 900–2000 m elevation.

Conservation Status
Due to its restricted (though geographically dispersed) range, relatively few occurrences, lack of protected occurrences, and effects of historic fire exclusion, Cascade reedgrass is ranked G3, globally vulnerable. It is of conservation concern in the states where it occurs.

History
Cascade reedgrass was first collected by Frank Tweedy, on the Green River trail in the Cascade Mountains in Washington Territory in 1882. It likely was Tweedy's first novelty (a species new to science). He discovered it during his first season botanizing in the American West, when he was working as a topographer on the Northern Transcontinental Survey. In his description of the new species, Scribner noted: "Mr. Tweedy has been a careful and zealous collector of the plants of the various sections of our country which he has visited, and it is with pleasure that I dedicate this species to him." It would be the first of many named in his honor. Scribner and Tweedy would later coauthor Grasses of Yellowstone National Park, published in 1886.

References

Perennial plants
tweedyi
Plants described in 1892